The 2008 United States presidential election in Pennsylvania was part of the 2008 United States presidential election, which took place on November 4, 2008, throughout all 50 states and the District of Columbia. Voters chose 21 representatives, or electors to the Electoral College, who voted for president and vice president.

Pennsylvania was won by Democratic nominee Barack Obama by a 10.32% margin of victory. Prior to the election, all 17 news organizations considered this a state Obama would win, or otherwise considered as a safe blue state. Although the Commonwealth of Pennsylvania had voted for the Democratic presidential nominee in every election since 1992, the margins of victory had become smaller over the past elections, as was highlighted in 2004 when John Kerry won the Keystone State by a slim margin of 2.50%. Since George W. Bush came relatively close to winning the state in 2004 and because Barack Obama lost the Democratic primary to Hillary Rodham Clinton by nearly 10% in April 2008, many analysts believed that Republican John McCain had a decent shot at winning Pennsylvania in the general election. Nevertheless, Pennsylvania remained blue and gave Obama 54.47% of the vote to McCain's 44.15%, a margin of 10.32%. Normally a close state, 2008 marked the first and only time since 1972 that Pennsylvania was decided by a double-digit margin and was the strongest Democratic showing in the state since 1964. However, Obama became the first ever Democrat to win the White House without carrying Fayette or Greene Counties, as well as the first to do so without carrying Beaver, Washington, or Westmoreland Counties since Woodrow Wilson in 1916, the first to do so without carrying Armstrong or Clinton Counties since John F. Kennedy in 1960, and the first to do so without carrying Forest, Indiana or Warren Counties since Jimmy Carter in 1976. As of 2020, this remains the last presidential election in which Pennsylvania did not weigh in as the most conservative state in the Northeast, as the state voted to the left of New Hampshire.

Democratic primary

The Democratic primary was held on April 22. Voters also chose the Pennsylvania Democratic Party's candidates for various state and local offices.

The Democratic primary was open to registered Democrats only. Polls opened at 7am and closed at 8pm. Senators Barack Obama and Hillary Clinton were the only candidates on the ballot for President of the United States. The primary was considered to be a "must win" for Clinton, who defeated Obama, but by a smaller margin than hoped for.

Hillary Clinton won the primary by 9.28%, a wider margin than expected than recent polls suggested, but smaller than most January and February polls. Despite her victory, she gained only nine delegates on Obama. In particular superdelegates were not swinging in her direction after her win; the Clintons had been trying to secure the support of Congressman Jason Altmire but he remained uncommitted after she won his district by 31% during the primary.

Delegates
The Pennsylvania Democratic Party sent 187 delegates to the 2008 Democratic National Convention. Of those delegates, 158 were pledged, and 29 were unpledged. All of the 158 pledged delegates were allocated (pledged) to vote for a particular candidate at the National Convention according to the results of the Pennsylvania Presidential Primary. The 29 unpledged delegates were popularly called "superdelegates" because their vote represented their personal decisions, whereas the regular delegates' votes represented the collective decision of many voters. The superdelegates were free to vote for any candidate at the National Convention and were selected by the Pennsylvania Democratic Party's officials.

The 158 pledged delegates were further divided into 103 district delegates and 55 statewide delegates. The 103 district delegates were divided among Pennsylvania's 19 Congressional Districts and were allocated to the presidential candidates based on the primary results in each district. The 55 statewide delegates were divided into 35 at-large delegates and 20 party leaders and elected officials (abbreviated PLEOs). They were allocated to the presidential candidates based on the preference of the delegates at the State Committee meeting on June 7.

Of the 29 unpledged delegates, 26 were selected in advance and 3 were selected at the State Committee meeting. The delegates selected in advance were 13 Democratic National Committee members, the 11 Democratic U.S. Representatives from Pennsylvania, Democratic U.S. Senator Bob Casey, Jr., and Democratic Governor Ed Rendell.

Importance of Pennsylvania
The primary was the first time since 1976 that Pennsylvania played a major role in a presidential nomination.

Importance of Pennsylvania for Clinton

As the race continued to Pennsylvania, Indiana, and North Carolina, many observers had concluded that Clinton had little chance to overcome Obama's lead in pledged delegates.

Former President Bill Clinton highlighted the importance of the state for the Clinton campaign saying on March 11 at an event in Western Pennsylvania that "If she wins a big, big victory in Pennsylvania, I think it'll give her a real big boost going into the next primaries ... I think she's got to win a big victory in Pennsylvania. I think if she does, she can be nominated, but it's up to you." This was a repetition of his tactic before March 4, warning supporters that his wife might not be able to continue if she did not win Ohio and Texas. Hillary Clinton emphasized that Pennsylvania was something of a home state for her, as her father came from Scranton, Pennsylvania, she and her brothers were christened there and had vacationed near there each summer, and her brothers still maintained the family cottage near there.

Importance of Pennsylvania to Obama
On March 18, 2008 Barack Obama chose Philadelphia as the site to deliver his much-anticipated "A More Perfect Union" speech dealing with the race and the controversy surrounding his pastor, Rev. Jeremiah Wright.

Campaign

Obama's "Road to Change" bus tour

Obama started a 6-day "Road to Change" bus tour across Pennsylvania, with stops in Pittsburgh, Johnstown, Altoona, State College, Harrisburg

On March 28, Obama started the bus tour with a rally in Pittsburgh's Soldiers and Sailors Memorial Hall. Obama was introduced and endorsed by Senator Bob Casey, Jr., who had indicated earlier that he would remain neutral in the democratic primary.

Casey traveled to Florida over the Easter holiday, where he said rain forced him to stay inside and think about the election. Obama's ability to "transcend" the racial divide and his ability to engage younger voters proved decisive to his decision. According to sources, Casey's four daughters lobbied their dad to endorse Obama.

On March 29, the Obama bus tour stopped at the Pleasant Valley Recreation Center in Altoona, where he famously bowled a 37. Both Obama and Senator Casey (who rolled a score of 71) lost to local homemaker Roxanne Hart, who rolled a score of 82. On April Fool's Day, Senator Clinton jokingly challenged Obama to a "bowl-off," with the winner taking all the delegates.

Controversy
On April 11, 2008, Huffington Post blogger Mayhill Fowler, a self-admitted Barack Obama supporter, reported that during an April 6 "closed press" fundraising event in San Francisco, California, Obama recounted the obstacles facing his campaign in the Pennsylvania primary as it pertained to rural, white voters. Fowler wrote that during the speech, Obama said the following:

You go into these small towns in Pennsylvania and, like a lot of small towns in the Midwest, the jobs have been gone now for 25 years and nothing's replaced them ... And they fell through the Clinton Administration, and the Bush Administration, and each successive administration has said that somehow these communities are gonna regenerate and they have not. And it's not surprising then they get bitter, they cling to guns or religion or antipathy to people who aren't like them or anti-immigrant sentiment or anti-trade sentiment as a way to explain their frustrations.

Fowler later posted a three-minute 30 second audio snippet confirming the accuracy of the remark. Senators Clinton and John McCain both issued statements condemning the remarks. Obama later defended his comments, but conceded: "I didn't say it as well as I should have." However, he also added: "I said something that everybody knows is true." Obama had addressed similar themes of guns, religion, and economics in 2004 during an interview with Charlie Rose.

Final week
On the last Friday before the primary, Senator Obama spoke on Independence Mall in Philadelphia, Pennsylvania, to a crowd of more than 35,000, the largest audience yet drawn by either candidate during the campaign. The crowd was nearly twice what had been projected and spilled over into nearby streets. The next day, Obama conducted a whistle stop train tour from Philadelphia to Harrisburg, drawing a crowd of 6,000 at a stop in Wynnewood and 3,000 at a stop in Paoli. On Monday, Sen. Obama held the final events of his Pennsylvania campaign in Scranton, McKeesport and at the University of Pittsburgh's Petersen Events Center.

The Saturday before the primary, Senator Clinton spoke in 5 Pennsylvania cities, including West Chester and York, Pennsylvania. More than 300 people showed up at the West Chester firehouse to hear the New York Senator speak. At the Wilson high gymnasium in West Lawn, Pennsylvania, Clinton told several hundred more supporters: "The job of a leader is to bring people together to solve problems . . . to understand that sometimes we have to fight to get the political will and the votes to make that happen". On Monday, April 21, Senator Clinton along with husband Bill Clinton spoke to a crowd of 6,000 in Downtown Pittsburgh. Other events were held Monday in Scranton, Harrisburg, and Philadelphia. Both candidates refused to participate in the political custom of street money.

Polls

Public opinion polling from early January 2007 through mid-February 2008 consistently gave Hillary Clinton a double digit lead over Barack Obama. By the beginning of April, polls of Pennsylvanians showed Obama trailing Clinton by an average of 5 points. According to 2 polls taken one day before the primary, Hillary Clinton was leading Barack Obama by 49%–42% and 51%–41%. Other polls showed Clinton leading by an average of about 6%.

Some superdelegates also announced their preferred candidates before the primary. As of April 30, 16 superdelegates had announced support for Senator Clinton and 5 had announced support for Senator Obama.

Results

Primary date: April 22, 2008

National pledged delegates determined: 158

Republican primary

The Republican primary was also held on April 22 and voters also chose the Pennsylvania Republican Party's candidates for various state and local offices.

Polls opened at 7:00 am and closed at 8:00 pm. John McCain was the winner. He had already been declared the presumptive Republican Presidential nominee, having secured enough delegate votes in earlier primary contests to win the nomination at the 2008 Republican National Convention.

Unlike on the Democratic side, little campaigning took place as John McCain had already clinched the nomination. Outsider candidate Ron Paul made several stops in the state, including his birthplace of Pittsburgh.

*Delegates are essentially unpledged in the Pennsylvania Republican primary.

Some media sources noted that Ron Paul and Mike Huckabee combined took in around 220,000 votes (about 27% of the vote), despite McCain's status as presumptive nominee and the statistical irrelevance of Pennsylvania, as a possible sign of continuing social conservative or libertarian unease with McCain's nomination and have speculated about whether these results could potentially affect McCain in the November general election. Although some strategists disputed this theory, pointing to low turnout among McCain supporters and arguing that primary results would not necessarily influence the November election.

Campaign

Predictions 
There were 16 news organizations who made state-by-state predictions of the election. Here are their last predictions before election day:

Polling

Both McCain and Obama led in various state polls taken from February until the end of April, when Obama took a steady, moderate lead in the state polling. Obama's lead was temporarily reduced to within margins of error and ties when Governor Sarah Palin of Alaska was announced as McCain's running mate in late August, but when the financial crisis of 2008 became a more potent election issue near the end of September, Obama then took a double-digit lead in the state polls, causing many analysts to no longer consider Pennsylvania a swing state in 2008. Nevertheless, John McCain campaigned heavily in the state near Election Day and some polls showed Obama's lead narrowing down to single digits. McCain hoped that Pennsylvania might be the swing state that ensured him a narrow victory. However, the economic crisis weighed heavily on the minds of voters across the country and in Pennsylvania it was no different where many voters blamed the Republicans for the collapse, ultimately helping Obama who ended up carrying Pennsylvania by a strong margin of 10.32%.

Fundraising
Obama raised $14,043,740. McCain raised $5,188,757.

Advertising and visits
Obama spent almost $42 million, while McCain spent almost $30 million. The Obama campaign visited the state 16 times. The McCain campaign visited here 31 times.

Analysis
McCain did win more counties than Obama, but the counties carried by Obama were by far the most populated of the state, including Philadelphia, Allegheny and Lehigh counties, home to the state's three largest cities: Philadelphia, Pittsburgh and Allentown respectively.

Obama did extremely well throughout eastern Pennsylvania. He won more than 80% of voters in the city of Philadelphia, and two of its suburban counties gave him 3-to-2 margins (the other suburban counties also voted for Obama). Democratic margins from Philadelphia and its suburbs were more than enough to ensure Obama's victory even if he had lost all the rest of the state. North of Philadelphia, the heavily industrialized, pro-union counties characterized by cities such as Scranton (birthplace of Obama's running mate, Joe Biden), Wilkes-Barre and Allentown strongly backed Obama as well. African-American and Latino voters, as well as younger college-age voters, in Monroe County and even in very Republican Pike and Wayne counties gave Obama a much greater share of the vote than Kerry received in 2004. He also managed to win two traditionally Republican counties in the eastern part of the state, Dauphin (home to the state capital, Harrisburg) and Berks (home to Reading); the last Democrat to carry these counties was Lyndon Johnson in 1964. In addition, Obama remained competitive in the two most Republican counties in the eastern region: Lancaster (which gave George W. Bush his largest margin of victory in the entire state) and York. While John Kerry lost Lancaster by 32%, Obama lost the county by only 12%, a substantial improvement.

John McCain, however, did best in Southwestern Pennsylvania (around Pittsburgh), a part of Appalachia and the central, rural "T". Central Pennsylvania is a Republican stronghold; John McCain won the vast majority of its counties, often by substantial margins. However, Southwestern Pennsylvania, until recently, was the most Democratic region of the state (except for Philadelphia). Historically, when a Democrat carries Pennsylvania, the entire lower-left corner of the state from Pittsburgh to Johnstown is coated blue. The heavily unionized, Appalachian counties in and around Pittsburgh strongly voted against Ronald Reagan in 1984; in that election the only other county in the state to vote Democratic was Philadelphia. In 2008, however, the Republicans won every single county in Southwestern Pennsylvania except for Allegheny County, home to Pittsburgh (which voted Democratic by 15%). It was one of the few regions in which Obama did worse than John Kerry. This largely mirrored Obama's struggles throughout Appalachia throughout the course of the Democratic primary, when voters in this region strongly backed Hillary Clinton.

The 2008 election confirmed Pennsylvania's status as a Democratic-leaning state. As Kerry showed in 2004, under most circumstances a Democrat can lose everywhere else in the state and still run up enough of a margin in Philadelphia and Pittsburgh to win. Pennsylvania would not vote for a Republican candidate until the 2016 Presidential election, when Donald Trump narrowly carried the state.

During the same election at the state level, Democrats picked up two seats in the Pennsylvania House of Representatives but Republicans picked up one seat in the Pennsylvania Senate. Democrats also picked up a seat in the U.S. House of Representatives in Pennsylvania's 3rd Congressional District as Democrat Kathy Dahlkemper defeated 7-term incumbent Republican Phil English by a 2.48% margin of victory. Dahlkemper received 51.24% of the vote while English took in 48.76%.

, this is the last election in which Carbon County, Elk County, Cambria County, and Berks County voted for the Democratic candidate.

Results

By county

Counties that flipped from Democratic to Republican
 Beaver (largest city: Beaver)
 Fayette (largest borough: Uniontown)
 Washington (largest borough: Washington)

Counties that flipped from Republican to Democratic
 Berks (largest borough: Reading)
 Cambria (largest borough: Ebensburg)
 Carbon (largest borough: Jim Thorpe)
 Centre (largest borough: Bellefonte)
 Chester (largest borough: West Chester)
 Dauphin (largest borough: Harrisburg)
 Elk (largest borough: Ridgway)
 Monroe (largest borough: Stroudsburg)

By congressional district
Although Barack Obama won Pennsylvania, John McCain carried 10 of the commonwealth's 19 congressional districts, including four districts held by Democrats. One district, PA-03, was extremely close, however, with McCain only winning by 17 votes. Obama won 9 districts, including two districts held by Republicans.

Electors

Technically the voters of Pennsylvania cast their ballots for electors: representatives to the Electoral College. Pennsylvania is allocated 21 electors because it has 19 congressional districts and 2 senators. All candidates who appear on the ballot or qualify to receive write-in votes must submit a list of 21 electors, who pledge to vote for their candidate and his or her running mate. Whoever wins the majority of votes in the state is awarded all 21 electoral votes. Their chosen electors then vote for president and vice president. Although electors are pledged to their candidate and running mate, they are not obligated to vote for them. An elector who votes for someone other than his or her candidate is known as a faithless elector.

The electors of each state and the District of Columbia met on December 15, 2008, to cast their votes for president and vice president. The Electoral College itself never meets as one body. Instead the electors from each state and the District of Columbia met in their respective capitols.

The following were the members of the Electoral College from the state. All 20 were pledged to Barack Obama and Joe Biden:
Lynne Abraham
Christopher Lewis
John Brenne
Valerie McDonald-Roberts
Eileen Connell
Thomas McMahon
Kathi Cozzone
Robert Mello
John Fetterman
Michael A. Nutter
William George
Corey O'Brien
Patrick B. Gillespie
Josh Shapiro
Richard Gray
Jack Wagner
Franco Harris
Michael Washo
George Hartwick
Daylin Leach

See also

 List of United States presidential elections in Pennsylvania
 2004 Pennsylvania Democratic presidential primary
 2008 Republican Party presidential primaries
 2008 Democratic Party presidential primaries

References

United States president
Pennsylvania
2008